is a Japanese idol girl group. The group was originally formed in 2012 by Victor Entertainment and have been performing independently since 2013. To reflect the group's name and concept, the members perform with microphones attached to the jewel on their pinky rings.

The original member line-up made their major label debut with the extended play Kimiiro Note in 2012 and later released the song "Blooming Song" in 2013.

History

2012–2013: Debut

Tone Jewel was formed by Victor Entertainment in 2012. To reflect the group's name and concept, the members performed with wireless microphones attached to their pinky rings. With the lineup consisting of Kana Sakura, Riko Kayama, and Keekihime Yumi, Tone Jewel was marketed as a trio of "hardcore otaku" high school girls and built a fanbase on Niconico. Keekihime, an Austrian native, had been recruited through an online audition held by Victor Entertainment and prior to joining, she was a vlogger on Niconico. The group first recorded music independently for a Touhou Project fan project. Their first extended play, Sistars Trip, was sold exclusively at Comiket 82 on August 11, 2012, with the cover artwork drawn by Keekihime.

Tone Jewel made their major label debut on August 22, 2012 with the extended play Kimiiro Note, featuring "Kimiiro Inryoku" as the promotional track. After the release of the song, Kayama departed from the group. On December 30, 2012, they released their first studio album, Meguru Kiseki, independently and sold it exclusively at Comiket 83, with the album illustration provided by Keekihime. Sana Takimura was later recruited as a second generation member. In 2013, Tone Jewel released their debut single, "Blooming Song", which was produced by Arte Refact.

At the end of 2013, Sakura left the group due to family reasons. Later that year, Keekihime and Takimura also departed from the group due to Keekihime's visa issues, which had limited her performances.

2014–present: Line-up and name changes

Miyabi Hazuki, Momoka Miyashita, and Chihiro Ayase, three girls who had previously been recruited into the group as research students (trainees), began performing under the name Tone Jewel Research Students under independent labels. After several member line-up changes, Tone Jewel was renamed and also established sister groups, such as End of Silence, Twist Jewel, and Tradition Jack.

Members

Current members

Former members

  (2012-2013)
  (2012-2014)
  (2012-2014)
  (2013-2014)

Discography

Studio albums

Extended plays

Major

Indie

Singles

References

External links
 
 Official website (2012-2014)

Japanese indie pop groups
Japanese idol groups
Musical groups established in 2012
2012 establishments in Japan